Robert Browne Hall (30 June 1858 Bowdoinham, Maine – 8 June 1907), usually known as R. B. Hall, was a leading composer of marches and other music for American Wind bands. A principal American composer of marching music, he was born in Bowdoinham, Maine and seldom left his native state during his lifetime, dying in Portland. His music though has traveled around the world. He is particularly popular in the United Kingdom, so much so that many lovers of brass band music there mistakenly imagine that Hall is an English composer. His celebrated march, "Tenth Regiment March", written in 1895 and dedicated to the Tenth Regiment Band in Albany, New York, is a well-known staple of brass band concerts and competitions all over the UK, under the title "Death or Glory".

Hall was famous during his lifetime as a particularly fine player on the cornet and served for a time as conductor of the Bangor Band.  As soloist, conductor, composer and teacher, Hall is still remembered in Maine. The last Saturday in June every year is officially Robert Browne Hall Day in the State of Maine.

Having suffered a stroke in 1902 from which he never recovered, he died in poverty in Portland as a result of nephritis five years later and was buried in Evergreen Cemetery in Richmond, Maine.  His widow sold the manuscripts of many compositions. Unscrupulous publishers assembled and realized from fragments works they passed off as genuine Hall compositions.

List of compositions 
He left over a hundred marches and other compositions, including such classics as:

Officer of the Day March
Independentia March
New Colonial March
Tenth Regiment March (Death or Glory)
Gardes du Corps March
Albanian March
American Cadet March
Charge of the Battalion
Colonel Fitch March
Colonel Philbrook March
The Commander March
Commonwealth March
Dunlap Commandery March
Fort Popham March
Greeting to Bangor March
Hamlin Rifles March
Marche Funebre
Norembega March
S.I.B.A. March
Second Regiment P.M. March
Veni, Vidi, Vici March
W.M.B. March

In popular culture
The trio from Hall's New Colonial March provides the music for Stanford University's official fight song, Come Join the Band.

The trio from Hall's "Officer of the Day March" provides the melody for the Alma Mater of Carleton College in Northfield, Minnesota.

His March "Death or Glory", 1895 is the music in the opening scene of the 1996 comedy-drama film about a Yorkshire coal-miner's band, "Brassed Off".

References 

R.B. Hall and the Community Bands of Maine, Gordon W. Bowie, Dissertation, University of Maine, 1993.

External links
 R.B. Hall entry on Mt. Ararat High School, Topsham ME website

 
 R. B. Hall Day - official annual Maine commemoration
 R. B. Hall on the National Jukebox

1858 births
1907 deaths
American cornetists
American male composers
American composers
People from Bowdoinham, Maine
Musicians from Bangor, Maine
19th-century American male musicians